Chinese Optics Letters is a monthly peer-reviewed scientific journal focusing on optics. Established in 2003, it covers optics research originating in the People's Republic of China as well as coverage from groups outside the country. 

According to the journal's website, the journal has a 2021 impact factor of 2.560. Although the journal is sponsored by the Chinese Optical Society, it is published in English by the Optical Society. The editor-in-chief is Zhizhan Xu (Chinese Academy of Sciences). Subject coverage includes fiber optics and optical communications, lasers and laser optics, nonlinear optics, integrated optics, optical and photonic materials, quantum optics, ultrafast optics, image processing, instrumentation, measurement and metrology.

Chinese Optical Society 
The Chinese Optical Society (COI) was founded in 1979 with Wang Daheng as its first president. Currently the society has 15,000 individual members. In 1987, the Chinese Optical Society interconnected with the International Society for Optical Engineering (SPIE) while forming a larger organization named by combining both nomenclatures; hence, this relationship became the Chinese Optical Society/International Society for Optical Engineering (COI-SPIE).

References

External links 
 

Optics journals
English-language journals
Optica (society) academic journals
Publications established in 2003
Monthly journals